The 1985–86 Lancashire Cup competition was the seventy-third occasion on which the tournament had been held. Wigan won the trophy by beating Warrington in the final by the score of 34-8.

Competition and results  
This season the total number of entrants remained at the 16 level. With this full sixteen members there was no need for “blank” or “dummy” fixtures or any byes.

Round 1 
Involved  8 matches (with no byes) and 16 clubs

Round 2 - Quarter-finals 
Involved 4 matches and 8 clubs

Round 3 – Semi-finals  
Involved 2 matches and 4 clubs

Final 
The match was played at Knowsley Road, Eccleston, St Helens, Merseyside, (historically in the county of Lancashire). The attendance was 19,202 and receipts were £56,030. The attendance was again at a very pleasing level, the second of the five-year period when it would reach around the 20,000 level.

This was Wigan's second appearance in two years and a first victory in what would become a run of four victories and five appearances in five successive years.

Teams and scorers 

Scoring - Try = four points - Goal = two points - Drop goal = one point

The road to success

Notes 
1 * Knowsley Road was the home ground of St. Helens from 1890 to 2010. The final capacity was in the region of 18,000, although the actual record attendance was 35,695, set on 26 December 1949, for a league game between St Helens and Wigan

See also 
1985–86 Rugby Football League season
Rugby league county cups

References

External links
Saints Heritage Society
1896–97 Northern Rugby Football Union season at wigan.rlfans.com 
Hull&Proud Fixtures & Results 1896/1897
Widnes Vikings - One team, one passion Season In Review - 1896-97
The Northern Union at warringtonwolves.org

RFL Lancashire Cup
Lancashire Cup